Dondo is a city and district Dondo District of Sofala Province in Mozambique.

Industry 

Dondo has a cement works which used limestone mined at Muanza.

Dondo has one of two concrete sleeper plants, the other being at Vila de Sena.

Dondo has factory building cement vulgar Lusalite materials.

Transport 

Dondo has a station on the Mozambican rail network, where the line to Malawi and Moatize junctions from the line to Zimbabwe.

Demographics

See also 

 Transport in Mozambique
 Railway stations in Mozambique

References 

Populated places in Sofala Province